The Catitipan Airport Road is a , two-lane road that formerly served as an access road to the Old Davao Airport in Davao. The current Airport Road is accessed through the Carlos P. Garcia National Highway.

The highway forms part of National Route 915 (N915) of the Philippine highway network.

History 
In 1955, it was declared a national secondary road due to Executive Order No. 113 by President Ramon Magsaysay. It formerly served as the airport road of the Old Davao Airport.

References 

Roads in Davao del Sur
Davao City